"There You'll Be" is a song by American country music singer Faith Hill. Written by Diane Warren, produced by Trevor Horn and Byron Gallimore, and orchestrated by David Campbell, the song was released on May 21, 2001, and was included on the Pearl Harbor soundtrack. The track also appears on Hill's greatest hits albums There You'll Be and The Hits. "There You'll Be" is about remembering deceased acquaintances and reminding oneself that they will always be with them. The power ballad was first offered to Celine Dion, who turned it down because she did not want to record another romantic ballad for a soundtrack album.

Upon its release, "There You'll Be" became Hill's highest-charting single in the United Kingdom and Ireland, reaching numbers three and four, respectively. The single topped the charts of Canada, Portugal, and Sweden and became a top-10 hit in the United States and several European nations. Music critics responded positively to the song, and it received a Grammy nomination for Best Female Pop Vocal Performance. The accompanying music video was directed by Michael Bay, who also directed Pearl Harbor. The video is set in the same time period as the film and draws many parallels.

Composition and lyrics
Musically, "There You'll Be" is a power ballad in the key of A-flat major, set in common time. Arden Lambert from Country Daily described the recording as a love song, writing, "The song starts with a mellow tone, but slowly builds up as the track advances. This melody simulates what people feel when they lose someone. Its lines speak of gratefulness to a deceased person who has shown you that there is more to life. It is a song that looks back on all the things they shared with you. Ultimately, it is a reminder that even if they are not with us anymore, you will know that they will continue to keep us strong as the line in the song says, "I'll keep a part of you with me, And everywhere I am there you'll be".

Critical reception
Arden Lambert from Country Daily declared "There You'll Be" as "a lovely ballad", noting Hill's "sky-high vocals" on the song. David Browne from Entertainment Weekly described it as a "ballad [with] orchestration that crests in choruses", stating that "soaring diva" Faith Hill can follow in the footsteps of Celine Dion and Trisha Yearwood. Mary Ann A. Bautista from Philippine Daily Inquirer wrote that it "makes the images of the movie "Pearl Harbor" come alive in your mind as you listen." A reviewer from Richmond Times-Dispatch noted the song as "vocally soaring" and "string-soaked". Randy Wilcox from The Robesonian called it a "pop gem". In her review of There You'll Be: The Best of Faith Hill, Kathy Korsmo from The Spokesman-Review said that Hill "is an amazing vocalist" and added that her versatility reminds of early Mariah Carey. Chuck Taylor of Billboard compared the song to Celine Dion's 1998 hit "My Heart Will Go On", describing it as having "lush orchestration, a chorus that flies above the clouds, and a vocal that makes Hill's signature 'Breathe' sound like a sleepy lullaby."

Chart performance
Released on May 21, 2001, "There You'll Be" reached a peak of number 10 on the US Billboard Hot 100 in July 2001 due to strong airplay. No commercial CD single was released because producers wanted to boost sales of the Pearl Harbor soundtrack, which forced the song to chart solely on airplay in the United States. The song also reached number 11 on the Billboard Country Singles Chart. On the Billboard Adult Contemporary chart, it stayed at number one for 11 non-consecutive weeks. For the issue of September 1, 2001, it tied Dido's single "Thank You" at number one with 1,595 detections—the first time this had happened since Billboard began using Broadcast Data Systems in 1991. Because both songs lost detections, and because the same number of radio stations were playing the two singles that week, a third tiebreaker based on the smallest decrease of plays had to be utilized; "There You'll Be" lost 125 plays while "Thank You" lost 15, so the latter song ascended to number one. In Canada, it topped the Canadian Singles Chart for three non-consecutive weeks.

In Europe, "There You'll Be" peaked at number one in Portugal and Sweden; in the latter nation, the single reached number one on August 2 and remained at the top for five weeks in total, ending 2001 as Sweden's 10th-most-successful hit. In the Flanders region of Belgium, the song rose to number two on the chart week of August 25 and was the region's 23rd-best-selling hit of the year. Elsewhere, the single peaked within the top 10 in Austria, Denmark, Germany, Ireland, the Netherlands, Norway, and Switzerland. It additionally became a top-20 hit in Finland, Italy, New Zealand, and Spain. On the Eurochart Hot 100, the song peaked at number six. In Australia, it reached number 24 and spent eight weeks on the ARIA Singles Chart.

"There You'll Be" is Faith Hill's highest-charting hit single in the United Kingdom, debuting and peaking at number three on the UK Singles Chart in June 2001 and spending 14 weeks inside the top 100. On September 20, 2008, a contestant named Amy Connelly sang the song for her audition on The X Factor. Her performance renewed interest in the original Faith Hill rendition of the song, and the track re-entered the UK Singles Chart at number 10 the next week based purely on downloads, which gave the song an extra four weeks inside the top 100. It gained yet another week on the chart in 2012, when it re-entered at number 47. The single is certified platinum in the UK and Sweden and gold in Belgium.

Awards and nominations
The song was nominated in 2002 for the Grammy Award for Best Female Pop Vocal Performance but lost out to "I'm Like a Bird" by singer Nelly Furtado. The song was also nominated for an Academy Award for Best Original Song, but also lost to Randy Newman's "If I Didn't Have You" from Disney/Pixar's Monsters, Inc..

Track listings

Personnel
Personnel are lifted from the US CD single liner notes and the There You'll Be album booklet.

 Diane Warren – writing
 Faith Hill – vocals
 Tim Pierce – guitar
 Ira Siegel – guitar
 Tony Shanahan – bass
 Rich Pagano – drums
 Trevor Horn – production
 Byron Gallimore – production
 Jamie Muhoberac – programming
 David Campbell – orchestration, conducting
 Fiachra Trench – arrangement
 James S. Levine – arrangement
 Bob Brockmann – recording
 Steve MacMillan – additional recording, mixing
 Mike Shipley – mixing
 James Duncan – assistant engineering
 Graham Hawthorne – Pro Tools
 Robert Hadley – mastering
 Sandy DeCrescent – music contracting
 Booker White – music preparation
 Jerry Bruckheimer – soundtrack executive production
 Kathy Nelson – soundtrack executive production, music supervision
 Bob Badami – music supervision
 Bill Green – executive in charge of music for the Buena Vista Motion Pictures Group

Charts

Weekly charts

Year-end charts

Certifications

Release history

See also
 List of Billboard Adult Contemporary number ones of 2001

References

2000s ballads
2001 singles
2001 songs
Canadian Singles Chart number-one singles
Country ballads
Disney songs
Faith Hill songs
Hollywood Records singles
Music videos directed by Michael Bay
Number-one singles in Portugal
Number-one singles in Sweden
Pop ballads
Song recordings produced by Byron Gallimore
Songs written by Diane Warren
Warner Records singles